Godda district is one of the twenty-four districts of Jharkhand state in eastern India It lies in the northeastern part of the state. The geographical area that now comprises Godda district used to be part of the erstwhile Santhal Parganas district. Godda town is the headquarters of Godda district. The area of the district is 2110 km², with a population of around 1,313,551.

Economy
Godda is mostly famous for the Rajmahal coalfield in Lalmatia. It is an integral part of Jharkhand and is known for its hills and small forests. The mine present here is an integral part of ECL coalfields and is among the biggest in whole Asia.

Until the late 1980s Godda was full of forests and was a remote place far from science and technology and was living in a dark age as other districts of Jharkhand. The entire scenario changed after coal was first discovered in abundance under the Rajmahal Hills by a team of the Geological Survey of India. Central Mine Planning and Design Institute Ltd. conducted a detailed survey of the area. The Rajmahal Opencast Coal mine project was conceived in early 1980s, initially to supply coal to Farakka Super Thermal Power Project of NTPC, with an initial annual capacity of 5 million tonne. For expansion of this coal mine project to 10.5 million tonne per annum, an agreement was signed between Coal India Limited and Canadian Commercial Corporation in January 1989 where MET-CHEM Canada Inc. was designated as the Canadian Executing Agency for implementing the project. The Project was completed in July 1994 and is being run by Eastern Coalfileds Limited personnel. This mine is producing 11.5 million tonne coal per annum. This is being expanded further to 17 million tonne.

Two more opencast coal mine of Eastern Coalfields Limited are coming in Godda district, Chuperbhita opencast coal mine project (capacity - 4 million tonne) and Hurra 'C' opencast coal mine project (capacity - 3 million tonne).

The main economic activity of the people is agriculture, and major crops are paddy, wheat and maize. The district is with rail link of Godda railway station. In 2006 the Indian government named Godda one of the country's 250 most backward districts (out of a total of 640). It is one of the 21 districts in Jharkhand receiving funds from the Backward Regions Grant Fund Programme (BRGF).

Politics 

 |}

Administration

Blocks/Mandals 

Godda district consists of 9 blocks. The following are the list of the blocks in Godda district:

Villages & Panchayats 
There are 201 panchayats  and 1634 villages in the district:

Divisions
There are three Vidhan Sabha constituencies in this district: Poreyahat, Godda and Mahagama. All of these are part of Godda Lok Sabha constituency.

Demographics

According to the 2011 census Godda district has a population of 1,313,551, roughly equal to the nation of Mauritius or the US state of New Hampshire. This gives it a ranking of 372nd in India (out of a total of 640).
Its population growth rate over the decade 2001-2011 was 25.14%. Godda has a sex ratio of 933 females for every 1000 males, and a literacy rate of 57.68%. Scheduled Castes and Scheduled Tribes make up 8.80% and 21.26% of the population respectively.

At the time of the 2011 Census of India, 20.60% of the population spoke Santali, 10.6% Khortha, 8.40% Urdu, 3.47% Hindi, 2.84% Bengali and 2.19% Malto as their first language. 'Others' under Hindi made up 47.68% of the population. The local dialect is Angika.

References

External links

Official district government website

 
Districts of Jharkhand